Dreyfus Point is a rounded low point on the west coast of Ioannes Paulus II Peninsula, western Livingston Island in the South Shetland Islands, Antarctica.

The feature is named after Iván Dreyfus, an Air Force engineer who participated in the 1949 Chilean Antarctic Expedition.

Location

Maps
 L.L. Ivanov et al. Antarctica: Livingston Island and Greenwich Island, South Shetland Islands. Scale 1:100000 topographic map. Sofia: Antarctic Place-names Commission of Bulgaria, 2005.
 L.L. Ivanov. Antarctica: Livingston Island and Greenwich, Robert, Snow and Smith Islands. Scale 1:120000 topographic map. Troyan: Manfred Wörner Foundation, 2009.

References
 SCAR Composite Antarctic Gazetteer.

Headlands of Livingston Island